Anti-marriage law may refer to:

Race-based anti-marriage laws:

 Anti-miscegenation laws, including:
 Prohibition of Mixed Marriages Act, in South Africa
 The Gesetz zum Schutze des deutschen Blutes und der deutschen Ehre, one of the Nuremberg Laws in Nazi Germany

Gender-based anti-marriage laws:

 The U.S. federal Defense of Marriage Act
 The Federal Marriage Amendment, which failed to pass
 Hawaii Constitutional Amendment 2 (1998)
 California Proposition 22 (2000)
 North Carolina Amendment 1